The set decorator is the head of the set decoration department in the film and television industry, responsible for selecting, designing, fabricating, and sourcing the "set dressing" elements of each set in a Feature Film, Television, or New Media episode or commercial, in support of the story and characters of the script.  The set decorator is responsible for each décor element inside the sets, from practical lighting, technology, art, furniture, drapery, floor coverings, books, collectables, to exterior furnishings such as satellite dishes, Old West water troughs, streetlamps, traffic lights, garden furniture and sculptures.

While the Set Decorator provides all of these elements, the Propmaster provides elements that are handled by the actor. For example: a library is decorated with set dressing such as the furniture, books, desk lamp, blotter, framed photos, personal effects, letter trays, letter opener, papers, paper files. The Propmaster provides the props – the letter the actor is opening and reading, the pen he writes with, and the ink into which he dips his pen.

Detailed description of the role of the set decorator
Set Decorators are Key Department Heads, hired by the Production Designer for their creative talent to implement the Production Designer’s vision and the visual interpretation of the script and its characters; and for technical skills and expertise in project management including budgeting, hiring, scheduling and organizing the Set Decoration Department staff.

Working in partnership with the Production Designer, the Director, and the Producer, the Set Decorator researches, budgets, designs and presents set decorating concepts for each set in the script.

Creatively, set dressing elements convey mood, style, time period, location, genre, character, and backstory, and shape the visual imagery of the project. Working with concepts from the Production Designer, approved by the Director/ Producer and Studio, along with drawings and illustrations from the Art Department, the Set Decorator budgets, designs, develops floor plans, sources, builds, schedules and eventually supervises the installation of the set dressing in each set, including industrial equipment, lighting fixtures, graphics, furniture, artwork, drapery, decorative accents, florals, floor coverings, and exterior décor to support the story.

Whether on Feature Films, Television shows, Commercials, Webisodes, or emerging media formats, this work of developing, selecting, and providing the dressing elements of the set is under the direct supervision of the Set Decorator.

The script breakdown
The Set Decorator begins each project by breaking down the script. This entails analyzing all scenes of the project, dividing them into sets, and detailing requirements. Each set has a creative concept behind it, partially described in the script and further developed by the Set Decorator in consultation with the Producer, Director and Production Designer.

Each set breakdown evolves into a series of lists of set dressing elements, all of which are budgeted, designed built and sourced. The production schedule and production budget delineate how these lists are achieved.

Design skills and education
The visual storytelling vocabulary of a Set Decorator includes history of design, art, architecture & interiors, photography and film, as well as geography, anthropology and psychology. The Decorator is knowledgeable about lighting, technical materials, textiles, mechanics of machinery and technology, paint techniques, construction practices, upholstery and drapery, decorating trends, period details, color theory, and is proficient at spatial furniture layouts for film.

This knowledge combines with strong research, design judgment, cultural understanding, and observation skills to create interior and exterior environments rich in character and style to bring the script to visual life.

Budgeting 
The Set Decorator creates a materials budget for the film or episode, and a labor budget based on the production schedule and scope of work. Labor costs are calculated to include overtime, fringes and kit rentals. The budget allows for equipping workshops, expendables, 2nd unit requirements, camera tests, and work performed for the Set Decoration department by other departments and specialty vendors.

Budgeting involves projecting costs for prototypes, and educated guesswork. Set Decorators are familiar with pricing structures for each element and labor required to complete the work within production schedules. Set Decoration budgets may be revised several times in the course of preproduction due to shifting circumstances.

Even after the Producer has approved the Set Decoration budget, the estimate is updated as special requests by the Director, script rewrites, or shifts in schedules bring changes during production. Overseeing creative aspects of Set Decoration while staying within the budget and delivering the sets on time are a key skillsets of the Set Decorator. Producers rely on the accuracy of the Set Decorators budget to ensure that the overall production budget remains within its bounds.

Collaboration 
The Set Decorator attends concept production meetings, scouts, safety classes, legal clearance briefings, product placement meetings, and ongoing conferences with the Production Designer, Director, Producers, the Art Department and Accounting.

The Set Decorator maintains communication with fellow Key Department Heads, including the Assistant Director, Director of Photography, Gaffer, Propmaster, Construction Coordinator, Lead Scenic Artist, Location Manager, Costume Designer, Greensman, Special Effects Coordinator, Key Grip, Production Sound Mixer, Visual Effects Producer, and Stunt Coordinator.  This ensures a smooth flow of information to fulfill the visual and technical requirements of the production.

The Set Decorator opens every set ensuring that the Director is satisfied, and makes any changes necessary.

Scheduling 
The Set Decorator works with his or her staff to develop a schedule of fabricating and procuring the set dressing elements. Working with the Leadperson and Location Manager, the Dress/Strike schedule is developed, dictated by the shooting schedule. This defines the labor budget for the Set Decoration department.

The Set Decorator schedules and supervises the work of the Assistant Set Decorators, Leadperson, Buyers, Budget Tracker, On-Set Dressers, Property Persons, Drapers and Upholsterers, and all inside and outside manufacturers

Staffing 
The Set Decorator selects, acquires, and oversees designs and builds for all the set dressing, He or she supervises the Assistant Decorators and Buyers as they source elements, and gives final approval to all choices.

Once the set dressing is prepared, the Leadperson supervises the transportation of all elements to the sets. After delivery to the stage or location, the Set Decorator directs the Set Dressing crew in the decoration of the set, following Safety Guidelines, IATSE Union Contracts and industry past practice. The Leadperson and Dressing crew work as a team within compressed schedules and side by side with Art Direction, Construction, Locations, Paint, Set Lighting, Grip, and Special Effects. Set maintenance plays a large part for long-term sets for many films and TV shows.

The Set Decorator is responsible for budgeting, hiring and managing his/her staff according to the requirements of each production including but not limited to:

Leadperson
Assistant Set Decorators
Buyer
Set Dressers / Swing Gang
On-Set Dressers
Set Decoration Coordinator
Drapers/ Upholsterers/ Floor coverers
Propshop Personnel for Set Dressing fabrication incl: Cabinetmakers/ Welders/ Painters/ Sculptors/ Moldmakers/ Graphic Artists
Outside Vendors incl: Technical advisors/ Vehicle builders/ Custom fabricators

Technical knowledge
Film and television blocking
Camera positions and lenses
Set lighting
Depth perception
Script continuity
Production scheduling
Research
Sourcing
Computer skills
Visual communication
Budgeting
Legal clearance parameters
Fire codes
Safety rules
"On Set" practice

Awards, recognition, and professional associations 
Set Decorators are eligible to receive the Emmy, BAFTA, Academy Award for Best Production Design, the Set Decorators Society of America's Film and Television Awards, and the British Film Designers Guild Production Design Awards along with the Production Designer, as well as recognition by the Art Directors Guild Award.  In Canada, Set Decorators are eligible to be nominated, alongside Production Designers, for the Canadian Screen Awards. 

Set Decorators are represented in North America by the IATSE labor union, under jurisdiction of Local 44 (Los Angeles), Local 52 (New York), and various other regional IATSE locals in the US, Canada, and Puerto Rico. In addition to IATSE in Canada, NABET 700 also represents Set Decorators and crew. 

The SDSA – the Set Decorators Society of America –  is the organization solely devoted to Set Decoration. The SDSA promotes the highest standards of excellence in the field worldwide, and preserves the legacy of set decoration in motion pictures and television, through its online magazine SETDECOR, INSIDE THE SET interviews, and social media presence. www.setdecorators.org .

References 

Filmmaking occupations
Arts occupations
Scenic design
 

fr:Ensemblier (technicien)